Church Rock is a census-designated place (CDP) in McKinley County, New Mexico, United States. The population was 1,128 at the 2010 census. Church Rock is named for Church Rock, a prominent natural landmark with the same name.

Navajo Nation government

Geography
Church Rock is located at  (35.534961, -108.611593).

Demographics

As of the census of 2000, there were 1,077 people, 258 households, and 214 families residing in the CDP. The population density was 450.7 people per square mile (174.0/km2). There were 299 housing units at an average density of 125.1 per square mile (48.3/km2). The racial makeup of the CDP was 98.14% Native American, 0.65% White, 0.09% African American, 0.28% from other races, and 0.84% from two or more races. Hispanic or Latino of any race were 1.39% of the population.

There were 258 households, out of which 56.2% had children under the age of 18 living with them, 43.4% were married couples living together, 31.0% had a female householder with no husband present, and 16.7% were non-families. 15.1% of all households were made up of individuals, and 3.5% had someone living alone who was 65 years of age or older. The average household size was 4.17 and the average family size was 4.65.

In the CDP, the population was spread out, with 42.2% under the age of 18, 11.7% from 18 to 24, 26.0% from 25 to 44, 15.6% from 45 to 64, and 4.5% who were 65 years of age or older. The median age was 22 years. For every 100 females, there were 92.0 males. For every 100 females age 18 and over, there were 87.3 males.

The median income for a household in the CDP was $27,917, and the median income for a family was $28,958. Males had a median income of $23,529 versus $21,016 for females. The per capita income for the CDP was $6,780. About 34.3% of families and 36.0% of the population were below the poverty line, including 47.5% of those under age 18 and none of those age 65 or over.

History

On July 15, 2019, a body was found in the trunk of a burning automobile near Church Rock. The FBI published a media alert.

Uranium mining

This was the largest release of radioactive waste in U.S. history, but until recently, no epidemiological studies were undertaken on the effects on the population. With the declining uranium market, two of the mines closed in 1983 and the third closed in February 1986.

In 2003 the Church Rock Uranium Monitoring Project was initiated by the Churchrock Chapter of the
Navajo Nation to assess environmental impacts of abandoned uranium mines and build capacity to conduct community-based research with policy implications. Its May 2007 report found that significant radiation from both natural and mining sources remains in the area; the community is dedicated to remedy the problem as much as possible.

In 2005 the Navajo Nation prohibited any further uranium mining in the nation.  In 2008 the US EPA and the Navajo EPA began a five-year plan to identify and ameliorate areas contaminated by uranium mining; their priority has been water sources and structures.

In 2013 the Churchrock Chapter passed a resolution supporting a demonstration in-situ mining at Section 8 and 17. The resolution passed with 68 in support 26 opposed and 16 abstained. Minority of community members continue to oppose mining operations as well as outside residents who reside in other chapters and non-Navajos.

Education
It is in Gallup-McKinley County Public Schools.

Culture
In August, the Gallup Inter-Tribal Ceremonial brings members of almost all Native tribes, as well as visitors, to Red Rock State Park.

Churchrock Chapter celebrates the annual, Treaty Day Festival on June 1. The first event took place on June 1, 2010. The event is to commemorate the signing of the Treaty of 1868 between the Navajo Tribe and United States Government to emancipate the Navajo people from Fort Sumner, New Mexico (Bosque Redondo).

Economy
Church Rock is the location of Fire Rock Casino, which opened on November 19, 2008.

References

External links

Census-designated places in McKinley County, New Mexico
Census-designated places in New Mexico
Populated places on the Navajo Nation